Pingnan is a county in the east of Guangxi, China.

Climate

References

 
Counties of Guangxi
Guigang